Richard Holtorf is an American politician and rancher serving as a member of the Colorado House of Representatives from 63rd district, which includes all or part of Logan, Morgan, Phillips, Sedgwick, Washington, Weld, and Yuma counties, including the communities of Sterling, Fort Morgan, Brush, Yuma, and Wray. Prior to 2023 and reapportionment, Holtorf represented the 64th house district. He assumed office on December 28, 2019.

Background
A lifelong resident of Washington County, Holtorf graduated from Akron High School and attended Colorado State University. He was in Army ROTC and was commissioned as an Army aviation officer in 1987. He served in aviation-related jobs in the Army on active duty and in the Army reserve for 29 years. His service included two tours in Afghanistan. He earned a degree from the U.S. Army War College. In 2016, he retired at the rank of colonel. In 2022, he described himself as "a third-generation cattle rancher, feedlot manager, dryland farmer, and state representative".

Appointment and elections
Holtorf was appointed to the Colorado House of Representatives after 64th district incumbent Kimmi Lewis died of cancer in late 2019. The Republican vacancy committee chose Holtorf from a field of five candidates, with Holtorf receiving 76 votes out of 115 delegates. Holtorf ran for the seat in 2020 and was elected to a full term.

In the 2020 reapportionment process, Holtorf's residence in Washington County moved from house district 64 to house district 63. District 63 is geographically smaller than the former district 64 and includes Logan, Morgan, Phillips, Sedgwick, Washington, Weld, and Yuma counties, including the communities of Sterling, Fort Morgan, Brush, Yuma, and Wray. 

In the 2022 Colorado House of Representatives election, Holtorf ran unopposed, winning 100.00% of the total votes cast.

When the Colorado General Assembly convened on January 9, 2023, Holtorf finished his term in the former district 64 and begin his term in the new district 63.

References

External links
Legislative website
Campaign website

Living people
People from Washington County, Colorado
Republican Party members of the Colorado House of Representatives
21st-century American politicians
Year of birth missing (living people)
United States Army War College alumni
Ranchers from Colorado
United States Army colonels